Boston Public, an American drama television series created by David E. Kelley debuted on Fox on October 23, 2000. The series was canceled during its fourth season, and Fox aired its final episode on January 30, 2004, although two episodes were left unaired by the network. The final two episodes were subsequently aired on March 1 and 2, 2005 on TV One. The series centers on the teachers and students of Winslow High School, a fictional public high school located in Boston, Massachusetts.

Series overview

Episodes

Season 1 (2000–01)

Season 2 (2001–02)

Season 3 (2002–03)

Season 4 (2003–04)

See also 
 List of The Practice episodes – includes crossover episode "The Day After"

References

External links 
 

Lists of American drama television series episodes